Muhammad Hanif Pathan (6 April 1901 - 1989) was a Bangladeshi folklorist and antiquarian. He is best known for publicizing the Wari-Bateshwar ruins, an ancient fort city and archaeological site of Bangladesh dating back to 450 BC. He is credited as the highest number of proverbs collector in Bangladesh.

Early life
Pathan was born on 6 April 1901 (23 Choitro 1307) ‍at the village of Deewanchar, Raipura of the then Bengal Presidency of  British India (now Bangladesh) to his maternal house. His ancestral residence was in Bateshwar village of Belabo Upazila. He passed the Normal Examination (professional training institute for the teachers) from Dhaka Normal School in 1921. He then began his career as a school teacher and was involved in the teaching profession until his death.

Books
 Bangla Prabad-Parichiti (two-volume compilation of proverbs)
 Pallisahityer Kudana Manik (1937)

Gallery

References

1901 births
1989 deaths
People from Narsingdi District
Bangladeshi folklorists